Marcia Blank (born May 21, 1944),, known as Marcie Blane, is a former American pop singer from 1962 to 1965.

Life and career 
Blane was born in Brooklyn, New York.

As a favor to a friend, Blane recorded a demo for Seville Records. The song was "Bobby's Girl". Released in the fall of 1962, "Bobby's Girl" made No. 2 on the Cash Box chart and No. 3 on the Billboard Hot 100, and was later recorded for the German market in their language. It sold over one million copies by 1963, and was awarded a gold disc. In the United Kingdom the song was covered by Susan Maughan who had the hit. "What Does A Girl Do?", the follow-up single, rose to No. 82 on the Hot 100 list in early 1963, and was Blane's only other appearance on any Billboard chart.

Discography

Singles

Compilation album 
Bobby's Girl: The Complete Seville Recordings (2004, President Records)
 "Bobby's Girl" (Mono) 2:18
 "A Time to Dream" 2:03
 "What Does a Girl Do?" 2:18
 "How Can I Tell Him?" 2:59
 "Little Miss Fool" 2:23
 "Ragtime Sound" 2:18
 "You Gave My Number to Billy" 2:08
 "Told You So" 2:00
 "Why Can't I Get a Guy" 2:08
 "Who's Going to Take My Daddy's Place?" 2:26
 "Bobby Did" 2:17
 "After the Laughter" 2:19
 "The Hurtin' Kind" 2:42
 "She'll Break the String" 2:22
 "Wer Einmal 'A' Gesagt (What Does a Girl Do?)" 2:16
 "So Ist Das Leben (How Can I Tell Him?)" 3:01
 "Guessin' Games" (Previously Unreleased Demo) 2:00
 "Thank You" (Previously Unreleased Demo) 2:14
 "Suddenly It's Over" (Previously Unreleased Demo) 2:08
 "I'm Just a Cute Little Girl" (Previously Unreleased Demo) 1:51
 "A Time to Dream" (Previously Unreleased Demo) 2:08
 "Bobby's Girl" (Previously Unreleased Demo – Stereo) 2:23

References

External links 
The Marcie Blane Story

1944 births
Living people
American women pop singers
Musicians from Brooklyn
Singers from New York (state)
21st-century American women